Côteaux is a commune in the Côteaux Arrondissement, in the Sud department of Haiti. In 2009, it had a population of 19,372 inhabitants.

Settlements

References

Populated places in Sud (department)
Communes of Haiti